Andrzej Kubica (born July 7, 1972) is a former Polish football player. He played in Poland, France, Israel and Japan and retired in 2007.

Club career
Kubica played for OGC Nice in the French Ligue 1. He was the top scorer of the Israeli Premier League in 1999 and then moved to Japan in 2000 to score 11 goals to help Urawa Red Diamonds get back to the J1 League.

Club statistics

Honours

Club
Legia Warsaw
 Ekstraklasa: 1994–95
 Polish SuperCup runner-up: 1995

OGC Nice
 Coupe de France: 1997

Maccabi Tel Aviv
 Toto Cup: 1998–99
 Israeli Premier League runner-up: 1998–99, 2003–04

Individual
Top scorer Israeli Premier League: 1998–99 (21 goals)

References

External links

1972 births
Living people
Polish footballers
Zagłębie Sosnowiec players
SK Rapid Wien players
FK Austria Wien players
Legia Warsaw players
K.S.V. Waregem players
Standard Liège players
OGC Nice players
Maccabi Tel Aviv F.C. players
Urawa Red Diamonds players
Oita Trinita players
F.C. Ashdod players
Beitar Jerusalem F.C. players
Górnik Łęczna players
Ekstraklasa players
I liga players
Belgian Pro League players
Ligue 1 players
Austrian Football Bundesliga players
Liga Leumit players
Israeli Premier League players
J2 League players
Polish expatriate footballers
Expatriate footballers in Austria
Expatriate footballers in Belgium
Expatriate footballers in France
Expatriate footballers in Israel
Expatriate footballers in Japan
Polish expatriate sportspeople in Austria
Polish expatriate sportspeople in Belgium
Polish expatriate sportspeople in France
Polish expatriate sportspeople in Israel
Polish expatriate sportspeople in Japan
People from Będzin
Sportspeople from Silesian Voivodeship
Association football forwards